Roberta Faccin (born 28 April 1957) is an Italian basketball player. She competed in the women's tournament at the 1980 Summer Olympics.

References

External links
 

1957 births
Living people
Italian women's basketball players
Olympic basketball players of Italy
Basketball players at the 1980 Summer Olympics
People from Ivrea
Sportspeople from the Metropolitan City of Turin
20th-century Italian women